On Your Mark is a 2021 Chinese drama film directed by Chiu Keng Guan and starring Wang Yanhui, Zhang Youhao, and Gong Beibi.

Plot
The film follows the story of a father and son who participate in a marathon and thus come to understand and improve themselves.

Cast
 as Xiao Daming
 as Xiao Erdong
Gong Beibi as Xia Lu
Li Xiaopang (李小胖)
He Nan (鹤男)
Zhao Liang (赵亮)
Li Yu (李彧)

Production
The film was shot in Chongqing. Filming took 55 days.

Release
The film was released on 18 June 2021, just before Father's Day.

Reception
On the day of its release, On Your Mark was the top-earning film in the Chinese box office. As of 27 June 2021, the film's box office total was 105 million RMB.

Critic Derek Elley called it "a disease-of-the-week melodrama grafted onto a dysfunction". He criticized the screenwriting and directing but praised Wang Yanhui's performance.

See also
 Never Stop (film)

References

External links

Films shot in Chongqing
Chinese drama films
Chinese-language films
Chinese sports films
Films about families
2021 drama films
2020s sports drama films